The following is a list of Radio Disney Music Award winners and nominees for Breakout Artist.

Winners and nominees

2010s

References

Breakout Artist